The Columbia District was a fur trading district in the Pacific Northwest region of British North America in the 19th century. Much of its territory overlapped with the disputed Oregon Country.  It was explored by the North West Company between 1793 and 1811, and established as an operating fur district around 1810. The North West Company was absorbed into the Hudson's Bay Company in 1821 under which the Columbia District became known as the Columbia Department. The Oregon Treaty of 1846 marked the effective end of the Hudson's Bay Company's Columbia Department.

Early years
Beginning in 1807, David Thompson, working for the North West Company (NWC), explored much of what would become the Columbia District. In 1811 he located Athabasca Pass, which became the key overland connection to the emerging fur district.

The American Pacific Fur Company (PFC) founded Fort Astoria near the entrance of the Columbia River and began to counter the interior NWC trade posts. Funded largely by German-American merchant John Jacob Astor, the company men had previously sailed around Cape Horn on board . During the War of 1812, the Pacific Northwest was a distant region of the conflict. Prior to the war, both companies operated in the region peaceably with each other. News of a coming British warship put the American company into a difficult position. In October 1813, management met at Fort Astoria and agreed to liquidate its assets to the NWC.  arrived the following month and in honor of George III of the United Kingdom, Fort Astoria was renamed to Fort George.

North West Company

In 1815 the North West Company's business west of the Rocky Mountains was officially divided into two districts, the older New Caledonia District in the northern interior, and the Columbia District to the south. Also in 1815 the New Caledonia district began receiving the bulk of its annual supplies by sea from the lower Columbia River rather than overland from Fort William and Montreal. By 1820 the North West Company operated six posts on the lower Columbia River and its tributaries, including Fort George (Astoria), Fort Nez Percés, Fort Okanogan, Spokane House, Flathead Post, and Kootanae House.

Under the North West Company the Columbia District was bounded, roughly, by the southern edge of the Thompson River on the north, and by the southern and eastern limits of the Columbia River basin.  North and west of the Thompson was the New Caledonia fur district, in what is now north-central British Columbia. The Thompson River region was its own fur district, centered on a fur trading post that later became the city of Kamloops. The Thompson River District was the link between the Columbia and New Caledonia Districts.

In the Treaty of 1818 between the U.S. and Britain, the two powers agreed that each had free and open access to the Oregon Country. This "joint occupation" continued until the Oregon Treaty of 1846, yet American attempts to conduct commercial operations in the region failed in the face of competition by the Hudson's Bay Company. The only sphere in which the Americans temporarily dominated was the maritime fur trade along the coast. But the HBC successfully took over the coastal maritime trade during the 1830s by for example constructing trading forts.

The North West Company found the Native Americans of the Columbia region generally unwilling to work as fur trappers and hunters. The company depended upon native labor east of the Rocky Mountains and found it difficult to operate without assistance in the west. For this reason the company began, in 1815, to bring groups of Iroquois, skilled at hunting and trapping, from the Montreal region to the Pacific Northwest. This practice soon became standard policy and was continued for many years by both the North West Company and the Hudson's Bay Company and was essential for the extension of the fur trade into much of the Columbia basin. The Iroquois were intended not only to support company personnel but, it was hoped, teach local natives the skills of hunting and trapping, and convince them to take up the work. This effort was largely unsuccessful. The reason generally given for the unwillingness of the natives to take up trapping and hunting was that their way of life was highly focused on salmon and fishing, and that the abundance of salmon resulted in little incentive for taking up hunting and trapping. Instead of cooperation there were altercations between the Iroquois and local natives. In 1816 parties of the North West Company, including a number of Iroquois, explored the Cowlitz River valley and the Willamette Valley, reaching as far south as the Umpqua River. Both exploring expeditions ended with violent clashes between the Iroquois and local natives. In addition the North West Company began to hire Native Hawaiians, known as Kanakas. This practice was continued and greatly expanded by the Hudson's Bay Company.

The North West Company was unchallenged in the fur trade of the region from 1813 to 1821, when it was merged with the Hudson's Bay Company. During this period the company put into practice the system attempted by the Astorians' Pacific Fur Company. A supply ship arrived each spring at Fort George (Astoria). Fur brigades from the interior of the Columbia and New Caledonia districts would converge on Fort George each spring. Furs were loaded on the ship and supplies carried back to the interior. The ship would then carry the furs to Canton, China, where furs would be exchanged for tea and other goods, which were then carried to Britain, completing a global circuit. Company letters, reports, and personnel were generally conveyed overland along a route between Fort George and Fort William on Lake Superior, making use of Athabasca Pass. Later, under the Hudson's Bay Company, the York Factory Express used this route, reoriented to York Factory on Hudson Bay.

The Columbia District under the North West Company was only marginally profitable at best. There were numerous problems at many posts. The only consistently profitable areas were the Kootenay River and Snake River countries. New Caledonia produced many furs, but its remoteness made it costly to operate. Nevertheless, the North West Company succeeded in creating a functional network oriented to the Pacific via the Columbia River. Another important legacy was the construction of Fort Nez Perces on the Columbia River near its confluence with the Snake River. Fort Nez Perces would long remain a strategic site, located at the junction of a variety of trails leading to vastly different regions. The fort became an important center for the procurement of horses, a base for expeditions far to the southeast, and a focal point for fur brigades preparing to journey through the Columbia River Gorge. The shipping of furs to Canton, China, was a financial failure for both the North West Company and, later, the Hudson's Bay Company, in part due to the East India Company's monopoly on British trade in the Far East.

Hudson's Bay Company
The North West Company was merged with the Hudson's Bay Company in 1821. Operations west of the Rocky Mountains were reorganized and the fur districts of New Caledonia and Columbia were merged in 1827 under the name Columbia Department. The name New Caledonia continued to be used for the old northern district, and in time came to be used for areas such as the Fraser Canyon and the Lower Mainland.

In 1824 the Hudson's Bay Company built Fort Vancouver on the lower Columbia River to serve as the headquarters of the entire Columbia Department, which was previously the role of Fort Astoria (renamed Fort George).

The Hudson's Bay Company York Factory Express, overland route to Fort Vancouver, evolved from an earlier express brigade used by the North West Company between Fort Astoria (renamed Fort George) to Fort William on Lake Superior. By 1825 there were usually two brigades, each setting out in spring from opposite ends of the route, Fort Vancouver, and York Factory on Hudson Bay, and passing each other in the middle of the continent. Each brigade consisted of about forty to seventy five men and two to five specially made boats and traveled at breakneck speed (for the time). Indians along the way were often paid in trade goods to help them portage around falls and unnavigable rapids. An 1839 report cites the travel time as three months and ten days—almost 26 miles (40 km) per day on average. This established a 'quick' (about 100 days for 2600 miles (4200 km)) way to resupply their forts and fur trading centers as well as transmitting messages between Fort Vancouver and York Factory on Hudson Bay.  

The supplies were brought into Fort Vancouver and York Factory by ship every year (they tried to maintain one years extra supplies to avoid disastrous ship wrecks etc.). The furs they had traded were shipped back on the supply ships with the furs from Fort Vancouver often being shipped to China where they were traded for Chinese goods before returning to England. The furs from York factory being sold in London in an annual fur sale.  The brigades carried supplies in and furs out by boat, horseback and as back packs for the forts and trading posts along the route. They also carried status reports for supplies needed, furs traded etc. from Dr. John McLoughlin, Chief Factor of the Columbia District HBC operations, and the other fort managers along the route.  This continued until 1846.

Between the acquisition of the North West Company in 1821 and the Oregon Treaty of 1846, the HBC greatly expanded the operations of the Columbia Department. The fur trade was extended to essentially every major river from the Yukon River in the north to the mouth of the Colorado River in the south, and east to the headwaters of the Missouri River tributaries. American fur trade competition was effectively blocked through various strategies, including selectively overhunting frontier regions to create "fur deserts", and the construction of forts on the Pacific Northwest coast to intercept furs before American ships could acquire them.

The HBC also diversified their economic activity and began exporting agricultural foodstuffs, salmon, lumber, and other products. Russian Alaska, Hawaii, and Mexican California were developed as markets for these exports. The HBC opened agencies in Sitka, Honolulu, and Yerba Buena (San Francisco) to facilitate the trade.

Fort Vancouver was the nexus for the fur trade on the Pacific Coast; its influence reached from the Rocky Mountains to the Hawaiian Islands, and from Alaska into Mexican-controlled California. At its pinnacle, Fort Vancouver watched over 34 outposts, 24 ports, six ships, and 600 employees. The employment of Hawaiian Kanakas was gradually expanded until at least 207 in the Columbia Department by 1845, with 119 located at Fort Vancouver. Also, for many settlers the fort became the last stop on the Oregon Trail as they could get supplies before starting their homestead.

By 1843 the Hudson's Bay Company operated numerous posts in the Columbia Department, including Fort Vancouver, Fort George (Astoria), Fort Nisqually, Fort Umpqua, Fort Langley, Fort Colville, Fort Okanogan, Fort Kamloops, Fort Alexandria, Flathead Post, Kootanae House, Fort Boise, Fort Hall, Fort Simpson, Fort Taku, Fort McLoughlin (in Milbanke Sound), Fort Stikine, as well as a number of others.

Increasing numbers of American settlers arriving on the Oregon Trail gave rise to the Oregon boundary dispute. With the signing of the Oregon Treaty in 1846 the U.S.-British boundary was fixed on the 49th parallel. This effectively destroyed the geographical logic of the HBC's Columbia Department, since the lower Columbia River was the core and lifeline of the system. The U.S. soon organized its portion as the Oregon Territory. The administrative headquarters of fur operations, and of the Columbia Department, then shifted to Fort Victoria, which had been founded by James Douglas in 1843 as a fall back position in preparation for the "worst case" scenario settlement of the dispute, in the face of manifest destiny.

By 1846, the Columbia District proper had been more than halved and the name had fallen into relative disuse, until revived when the new Mainland Colony needed a name.  The uncharted territory of the remainder of the Columbia District, including the remainder of the British coast north of Puget Sound, as far north as at least Queen Charlotte Strait (Fort Simpson and Fort McLoughlin were administered from Fort St. James, the capital of New Caledonia).  After 1846 New Caledonia informally referred to the Fraser Canyon Gold Rush region in 1848 and farther north the Cariboo Gold Rush area during the 1860s. As also had included Fort Langley since as early as 1827.

With the creation of the Crown Colony on the British mainland north of the then-Washington Territory in 1858, Queen Victoria chose to use Columbia District as the basis for the name Colony of British Columbia, i.e. the remaining British portion of the former Columbia District.

In their British Columbia Chronicle, historians Helen B. Akrigg and G.P.V. Akrigg coined the term "Southern Columbia" for the "lost" area south of the 49th Parallel, but this has never come into common use, even by other historians.

Historical figures
 Samuel Black
 Comcomly
 Sir James Douglas
 Chief Lolo
 John McLoughlin
 Chief Nicola (Hwistesmetxe'qen)
 Peter Skene Ogden
 Alexander Ross
 Chief Seattle (Sealth)
 Sir George Simpson
 James Sinclair
 David Thompson

See also 

Former colonies and territories in Canada
Territorial evolution of Canada after 1867
 Oregon Country
 Columbia Country
 Oregon boundary dispute
 Colony of Vancouver Island
 History of British Columbia
 History of Oregon
 Rupert's Land
 Pig War

References

Sources

External links 
 "Fort Vancouver Cultural Landscape Report" produced by the US National Park Service.

History of the Pacific Northwest
Fur trade
British North America
British colonization of the Americas
History of the American West
Oregon Country
Pre-statehood history of Oregon
Pre-statehood history of Washington (state)
Hudson's Bay Company
Divided regions